Household Gods may refer to:

 Household deity, a deity or spirit that protects the home
 Household Gods (band), a rock band featuring members of Slint and Unwound
Household Gods (novel),  a 1999 science fiction time-travel novel
Household Gods, a 1912 comedic play by Aleister Crowley
Household Gods: The Religious Lives of the Adams Family, a 2019 non-fiction book by Sara Georgini